Angelo Cipolloni (born 16 February 1970, in Rieti) is a retired Italian sprinter who specialized in the 100 and 200 metre races.

Biography
He won eight medals at the International athletics competitions, seven of these with national relays team. His personal best 200 metres time is 20.79 seconds, achieved in September 1996 in Rieti. His personal best 100 metres time is 10.37 seconds, achieved in June 1997 in Rome.

Achievements

National titles
He has won 4 times the individual national championship.
2 wins in the 200 metres (1995, 1996)
2 wins in the 200 metres  indoor (1995, 1997)

See also
 Italy national relay team

References

External links
 
 
 

1970 births
Living people
Italian male sprinters
Athletics competitors of Fiamme Gialle
Athletes (track and field) at the 1996 Summer Olympics
Olympic athletes of Italy
People from Rieti
World Athletics Championships medalists
Universiade medalists in athletics (track and field)
World Athletics Championships athletes for Italy
Mediterranean Games gold medalists for Italy
Mediterranean Games medalists in athletics
Athletes (track and field) at the 1997 Mediterranean Games
Universiade bronze medalists for Italy
Italian Athletics Championships winners
Medalists at the 1995 Summer Universiade
Sportspeople from the Province of Rieti